Queer is an early short novel (written between 1951 and 1953, published in 1985) by William S. Burroughs. It is partially a sequel to his earlier novel, Junkie, which ends with the stated ambition of finding a drug called Yage. Queer, although not devoted to that quest, does include a trip to South America looking for the substance.

Summary 

The novel begins with the introduction of "Lee," who recounts his life in Mexico City among American expatriate college students and bar owners surviving on part-time jobs and GI Bill benefits. The novel is written in the third person and Burroughs commented in the "Introduction" published in 1985, that it represents him off heroin, whereas in Junkie, his narrator was psychologically "protected" by his addiction. Lee is self-conscious, insecure, and driven to pursue a young man named Allerton, who is based on Adelbert Lewis Marker (1930–1998), a recently discharged American Navy serviceman from Jacksonville, Florida who befriended Burroughs in Mexico City.

Literary significance and criticism
Queer was originally written as an extension of Junkie, which had been judged too short and uninteresting for publication. Burroughs lost interest in the manuscript, and chose not to return to it even after Junkie was accepted. It was doubtful whether much of the content could be published in the US at that time, since the heavy homosexual content and theme could be held as obscene. Jack Kerouac admired the work and thought it would appeal to "east coast homosexual literary critics". It was eventually published in 1985 with a new Introduction, when Burroughs's literary agent Andrew Wylie secured him a lucrative publishing contract for future novels with Viking. Reportedly, he had not read the manuscript in thirty years because of the emotional trauma it caused him. Much of it was composed while Burroughs was awaiting trial for the allegedly accidental homicide of his common-law wife Joan Vollmer.

The 25th Anniversary edition of Queer published in 2010, edited by Oliver Harris, made some small revisions to the text and, in an introduction, argued that the novel's real traumatic backstory was Burroughs' real life relationship with Lewis Marker, fictionalised in the narrative as Lee's hopeless desire for Allerton.

Despite his frequent and uncompromising writings on homosexuality, Burroughs has not been viewed as a gay author by many readers. In the words of Jamie Russell he has "been totally excluded from the 'queer canon'". According to Russell, Burroughs's life and writing suggests a gay subjectivity which has been deeply troubling to many in the gay community.

Film, TV or theatrical adaptations
An Erling Wold opera of the same title, based on the novel, premiered in the U.S. in 2001.

In 2011, Steve Buscemi was set to direct a film adaption of the book. The screenplay was written by Oren Moverman, director and writer of The Messenger. Steve led the first reading of Queer at the Sarasota Film Festival with Stanley Tucci, Ben Foster, John Ventimiglia, and Lisa Joyce.

In December 2022, it was announced that Luca Guadagnino would be directing a film adaptation of the novel with Daniel Craig starring in the lead role.

Notes

Sources
 Queer: 25th Anniversary Edition. Edited by Oliver Harris. New York: Penguin, 2010.
 Jamie Russell: Queer Burroughs. Palgrave MacMillan, 2001, 
 Ted Morgan: Literary Outlaw. New York: Avon, 1988

1950s LGBT novels
1985 American novels
1980s LGBT novels
American LGBT novels
Metafictional novels
Novels by William S. Burroughs
Novels set in Ecuador
Novels set in Mexico City
Novels with gay themes
Viking Press books